The National Braille Library is the first and only library for visually impaired people in Nepal. The library is located in Tripureshwor, Kathmandu in the building of Nepal Association for the Welfare of the Blind. The library was established on 27 March 2009 by Nirmala Gyawali, who herself is visually challenged.  All the books in this library are in English language.

The number of visitors is about 15-20 per month.

References

Libraries in Nepal
2009 establishments in Nepal